Jahanabad or Jehanabad may refer to:

India
 Kora Jahanabad, Uttar Pradesh, India.
 Jahanabad, Pilibhit,  a nagar panchayat in Pilibhit district, Uttar Pradesh, India
 Jehanabad district in Bihar, India
 Jehanabad, a town in Bihar, India
 Jahanabad, Uttar Pradesh (Assembly constituency)
 Jahanabad, Lucknow, a village in Uttar Pradesh

Iran

Fars Province
Jahanabad, Kazerun, a village in Kazerun County
Jahanabad, Kharameh, a village in Kharameh County
Jahanabad, Marvdasht, a village in Marvdasht County
Jahanabad, Neyriz, a village in Neyriz County

Hamadan Province
 Jahanabad, Famenin, a village in Famenin County
 Jahanabad, Nahavand, a village in Nahavand County

Isfahan Province
 Jahanabad, Isfahan, a village in Nain County

Kerman Province
 Jahanabad-e Bala, Kerman, a village in Fahraj County
 Jahanabad-e Deh Nazer, a village in Fahraj County
 Jahanabad-e Pain, a village in Fahraj County
 Jahanabad, Rafsanjan, a village in Rafsanjan County
 Jahanabad, Rigan, a village in Rigan County

Kermanshah Province
 Jahanabad, Kermanshah, a village in Kermanshah County

Kohgiluyeh and Boyer-Ahmad Province
 Jahanabad-e Baraftab, a village in Boyer-Ahmad County
 Jahanabad-e Markazi, a village in Boyer-Ahmad County
 Jahanabad-e Sofla, Kohgiluyeh and Boyer-Ahmad, a village in Boyer-Ahmad County

Lorestan Province
 Jahanabad, Borujerd, a village in Borujerd County
 Jahanabad, Dorud, a village in Dorud County
 Jahanabad, Khorramabad, a village in Khorramabad County
 Jahanabad, Selseleh, a village in Selseleh County
 Jahanabad, Firuzabad, a village in Selseleh County

Markazi Province
Jahanabad, Markazi, a village in Mahallat County

Qazvin Province
Jahanabad, Zahray-ye Pain, a village in Buin Zahra County
Jahanabad, Takestan, a village in Takestan County

Razavi Khorasan Province
Jahanabad, Dargaz, a village in Dargaz County
Jahanabad, Nishapur, a village in Nishapur County
Jahanabad, Bujgan, a village in Torbat-e Jam County
Jahanabad, Salehabad, a village in Torbat-e Jam County
Jahanabad, Torbat-e Jam, a village in Torbat-e Jam County
Jahanabad-e Maleki, a village in Torbat-e Jam County

Semnan Province
Jahanabad, Meyami, a village in Meyami County

Sistan and Baluchestan Province
Jahanabad-e Sofla, Sistan and Baluchestan, a village in Hirmand County
Jahanabad-e Sofla, Sistan and Baluchestan, a village in Hirmand County
Jahanabad Rural District, in Hirmand County

South Khorasan Province
Jahanabad, South Khorasan, a village in Sarayan County

Tehran Province
Jahanabad, Tehran, a village in Tehran County
Jahanabad, Varamin, a village in Varamin County

Yazd Province
Jahanabad, Meybod, a village in Meybod County
Jahanabad-e Meybod Industrial Estate, a village in Meybod County
Jahanabad, Taft, a village in Taft County

Pakistan
 Jahanabad (Karachi), one of the neighbourhoods of SITE Town in Karachi, Sindh, Pakistan
 Jahanabad (Sargodha), a Tehsil in Sargodha, Pakistan
 Jehanabad (Pakistan), at Swat District, in the Khyber Pakhtunkhwa Province of Pakistan.